This is a list of notable individuals born in Africa (outside the Arab World / North Africa) of Lebanese ancestry or people of dual Lebanese and local nationality born and/or residing in Africa.

Ghana
Juliet Ibrahim, actress
Majid Michel, actor

Ivory Coast
Mehdi Khalil, footballer
Nader Matar, footballer
Mahmoud Kojok, footballer

Liberia
Monie Captan, former foreign minister of Liberia
Fouad Hijazi, footballer
Wael Nazha, footballer

Nigeria
Gilbert R. Chagoury, businessman, diplomat and philanthropist
Hassan El Mohamad, footballer

Sierra Leone
Edward J. Akar, former Minister of Finance
John Akar, writer and diplomat; composer of Sierra Leone's national anthem
Tarek El Ali, footballer
Faisal Antar, footballer
Roda Antar, footballer
Kassim Basma, diamond exporter
Nabih Berri, Speaker of the Lebanese Parliament
Joe Blell, former Minister of Defense
Samir Hassaniyeh, activist
Ali Hijazi, head coach of the Sierra Leone national basketball team
Nahim Khadi, current president of the Sierra Leone Football Association
Jamil Sahid Mohamed Khalil, businessman and diamond tycoon
Hisham Mackie, diamond exporter
Farid Raymond-Anthony, writer and author
John Saad, former Minister of Housing and Infrastructural Development
 Walid Shour
Ali Hashem, journalist

South Africa
Fulton Allem, professional golfer#
Ken Costa, London-based South African banker and Christian philanthropist
Pierre Issa, professional football (soccer) player
Joseph Rahme, professional tennis player
Stephen Saad, CEO Aspen Pharmacare
Michael Sutherland, South African-born Australian politician 
Allan Thomas, professional footballer
Vic Toweel, professional boxer
Willie Toweel, professional boxer

See also
List of Lebanese people
List of Lebanese people (Diaspora)
Lebanese diaspora
Lebanese people in Ivory Coast
Lebanese people in South Africa
Lebanese people in Senegal
Lebanese people in Sierra Leone

References

Africa
Lebanese